Bushehr, also known as Bandar-e-Bushehr is a city in the Central District of Bushehr County, Bushehr province, Iran. It is a port city and the capital of the province. At the 2006 census, its population was 161,674 in 25,158 households. The following census in 2011 counted 195,222 people in 52,204 households. The latest census in 2016 showed a population of 223,504 people in 63,820 households.

Etymology 
The roots of the name "Bushehr" is uncertain. It is unlikely that it is derived from Abū Šahr ("father of the city"), a theory which remains popular. It may be an abbreviation of Bokht-Ardashir ("Ardashir has given"), though this is not backed by any conclusive evidence.

History

Origins
A number of alleged premodern references to Bushehr, including the first made by an Arab geographer in 1225, have been disputed as perhaps alluding to the modern city of Reishahr, a harbor 10 km to the south, where archaeological evidence points to the presence of a much older settlement. Reishahr is also most likely equivalent to the town of Mesambria, a place the Greeks knew since the campaign of Nearchus (died 300 BC), and which also has been occasionally identified with Bushehr.

Similar to other fishing and pearling villages in southern Iran, Bushehr was inhabited and managed by Arabs from the other side of the Persian Gulf. It was first during the early 19th-century, that direct Iranian control was established there.

Rise 
In 1734, the Iranian military commander Nader made Bushehr (then still a minor fishing village) the headquarters of the Persian Gulf fleet that he sought to create. This marked the start of Bushehr's rising importance. In order to build a massive warship, Nader even brought heavy wood from Mazandaran's forests, which was 1,000 km away from Bushehr. The shell of this ship drew notice from European travelers for the next 50 years. The naval aspirations of Nader ended when he was murdered in 1747, but Bushehr continued to serve as an prominent port for at least the following 150 years. Between 1737–1753, the Dutch East India Company ran a trading facility there.

Aside from Bushehr's strategic significance—being situated 300 km from Shiraz and 600 km from that of Ottoman-ruled Basra—the place offered few benefits and numerous drawbacks. The town and its surrounding area were somewhat shielded by the interior's hilly terrain and narrow gorges, but were still vulnerable to pirate intrusion. In the 19th century, European ships had to dock around four kilometers offshore and transfer freight and passengers through small boats due to the shallow path to both the shoreline and the bay. Despite the numerous windcatchers on top of the houses, the water in the wells was salty, and the summer heat and humidity were unbearable.

The main commercial port of Iran
Bushehr soon replaced Bandar Abbas as the country's most important commercial port. This was because of Iran's political and economic centre being moved to Shiraz under the Zand ruler Karim Khan Zand, who had established his authority in western Iran.

Demographics 
Linguistic composition of the city.

Climate 
Bushehr has a hot semi-arid climate (Köppen: BSh) with a precipitation pattern resembling a Mediterranean climate, albeit it is both too hot and dry for too long to qualify as such, by a wide margin, due to the threshold for hot climates being much higher in terms of required rainfall.

Nuclear development

Bushehr is twelve kilometres from the site of the Bushehr Nuclear Power Plant being built in cooperation with Russia.  The work was begun by the Bonn firm  A.G., a unit of Siemens AG, which contracted to build two nuclear reactors based on a contract worth $4 to $6 billion, signed in 1975.

Work stopped in January 1979, and Kraftwerk Union fully withdrew from the project in July 1979, with one reactor 50% complete, and the other reactor 85% complete. They said they based their action on Iran's non-payment of $450 million in overdue payments.  The company had received $2.5 billion of the total contract. Their cancellation came following the 1979 Iranian Revolution. Iran subsequently requested that Siemens finish construction, but Siemens declined.  Shortly afterward Iraq invaded Iran and the nuclear programme was stopped until the end of the war. The reactors were damaged by multiple Iraqi airstrikes between March 1984 and 1988.

In 1995, Russia signed a contract to supply a light water reactor for the plant (the contract is believed to be valued between $700 million and $1.2 billion USD). The agreement calls for the spent fuel rods to be sent back to Russia for reprocessing. The plant started adding electricity to the national grid on 3 September 2011, and was officially opened in a ceremony on 12 September 2011.

References

Sources

External links

Bushehr Travel Guide
Bushehr, The Persian Gulf
Bushehr's travel review
 https://www.citypopulation.de/mapinex.html

Populated places in Bushehr County
Iranian provincial capitals
Cities in Bushehr Province
Port cities and towns in Iran
Port cities and towns of the Persian Gulf
Seleucid colonies